The peerage title Earl of Buckingham was created several times in the Peerage of England. It is not to be confused with the title of Earl of Buckinghamshire.

It was first created in 1097 for Walter Giffard, but became extinct in 1164 with the death of the second earl.  It may have been created again in 1164 for Richard de Clare ("Strongbow"), who died without issue in 1176.  It was created again in 1377 for Thomas of Woodstock, the youngest son of King Edward III.  He was created Duke of Gloucester in 1385.  The dukedom was forfeit on his attainder in 1397, but the earldom passed to his son, Humphrey, but became extinct on his death two years later.  The title was created a fourth time in 1618 for Mary Villiers for life only.  The title was created for a fifth time in 1617 for her son George Villiers, 1st Viscount Villiers, who was subsequently created Duke of Buckingham in 1623.  All titles became extinct on the death of the second duke in 1687.

Earls of Buckingham (1097), first creation
Walter Giffard, 1st Earl of Buckingham (d. 1102)
Walter Giffard, 2nd Earl of Buckingham (d. 1164)

Earls of Buckingham (1164), second creation
Richard de Clare, 1st Earl of Buckingham (d. 1176)

Earls of Buckingham (1377), third creation
Thomas of Woodstock, 1st Earl of Buckingham (d. 1397)
Humphrey, 2nd Earl of Buckingham (d. 1399)

Countesses of Buckingham (1618), fourth creation
Mary Villiers, Countess of Buckingham (1570–1632)

Earls of Buckingham (1617), fifth creation
see Duke of Buckingham, second creation

Impostor
From 1997 to 2006, Charles Stopford claimed to be the Earl of Buckingham.

References

Extinct earldoms in the Peerage of England
Noble titles created in 1097
Noble titles created in 1164
Noble titles created in 1377
Noble titles created in 1617
Noble titles created in 1618